This is a list of diplomatic missions in Syria. After the outbreak of the Syrian Civil War, many have been closed, withdrawn their ambassadors, or temporarily relocated to Beirut.

Diplomatic missions in Damascus

Embassies

Other missions or delegations 
 (General Delegation)
 (Swiss humanitarian aid office)

Consulates-General/Consulates

Aleppo

Damascus

Embassies closed due to the war/Vacant embassy

Embassies to open

Non-resident embassies
Resident in Amman, Jordan:
 
 

Resident in Beirut, Lebanon:

 
 (Delegation)
 
 
 
 
 

 
 
 

Resident in Cairo, Egypt:

Resident in Kuwait City, Kuwait:

Resident in Tehran, Iran:

See also
 Foreign relations of Syria
 List of diplomatic missions of Syria

Notes

References
 
Foreign Embassies in Syria

 
Diplomatic missions
Syria